The 1988 California State Senate elections were held on November 8th in the twenty odd-numbered Senate districts. There was no change to the representation of the Democratic and Republican parties.

Overview

District 1

District 3

District 5

District 7

District 9

District 11

District 13

District 15

District 17

District 19

District 21

District 23

District 25

District 27

District 29

District 31

District 33

State Senate
1988
California
California State Senate election